The 1961 Nebraska Cornhuskers football team was the representative of the University of Nebraska and member of the Big Eight Conference in the 1961 NCAA University Division football season. The team was coached by Bill Jennings and played their home games at Memorial Stadium in Lincoln, Nebraska.

Before the season
Coach Jennings returned for a fifth year, with pressure mounting to put an end to the string of losing seasons that preceded his arrival.  There were no changes to his assistant coaching staff for the first time in his tenure, providing a small amount of hope for enough consistency in coaching that might translate to success on the field.  The schedule was favorable, with a home field Syracuse match as the only powerhouse nonconference foe on the slate, though it was those games that Jennings tended to win with an upset.

Schedule

Roster

Depth Chart

Coaching staff

Game summaries

North Dakota

The Cornhuskers came out with a roar to open 1961, racking up 33 unanswered points without a serious challenge from the visiting Fighting Sioux.  The overmatched North Dakota squad managed only five first downs all day, and suffered the first shutout dealt by Nebraska since a 16–0 blanking given to Kansas State in 1955.  This was the only time these teams met on the field until 2022.

Arizona

Nebraska and Arizona met for the first time in a closely fought battle.  For every Cornhusker score, the Wildcats answered.  No spectacular plays stood out on the day, just consistent production which was enough to hold on through most of the game.  As the final seconds ticked away, Arizona landed on the Nebraska 27 yard line and scrambled to set up for a field goal, but time expired before they could run the play.  The 14–14 final was Nebraska's first tie since a 21–21 split decision to Illinois in 1953. It is also the Cornhuskers' last tie at Memorial Stadium; all subsequent ties prior to the adoption of overtime in 1996 occurred on the road, the last at Colorado in 1991.

Kansas State

The Cornhuskers rolled unchallenged over the Wildcats with a punishing ground attack.  Newcomer HB Willie Ross scored the first touchdown of his career on a one-yard push, and then put in two more before the time expired.  It was the first loss handed to Kansas State on the year.  The shutout victory was Nebraska's third unbeaten game in a row, which had not happened since 1955, and was the first time the Cornhuskers had opened a season with three unbeaten games since 1952.  Nebraska's historic domination of Kansas State now stood at 34–9–2.

Syracuse

Riding an early wave of success, and mindful of their pattern of good fortune when going into a game as a serious underdog, Nebraska welcomed Syracuse into Lincoln in a bid to upset one of the highest-ranked teams of the east.    The Orangemen proved to be a formidable opponent, playing relatively error-free football so as to not hand the game over to the Cornhuskers.  Two costly interceptions that were converted into touchdowns also hurt Nebraska, and Syracuse dealt the first defeat of the Cornhuskers season.  It was the third win in a row for the Orangemen over Nebraska, as they improved to 6–4–0 in the series.  Syracuse finished the season at #14 in the AP Poll.

Oklahoma State

The Cornhuskers made their first ever appearance in Stillwater against second-year Big 8 newcomer Oklahoma State.  The Cornhuskers scored first, but further efforts were soon enough halted by a stiff Cowboy defensive effort.  In the third quarter, Nebraska turned over a demoralizing fumble on their own 1-yard line to help Oklahoma State go ahead 7–0.  The Cowboys then ground out a long, sustained drive over most of the final period to put in one more score to seal the game.  The Cowboys remained perfect over the Cornhuskers in both attempts.

Nebraska did not lose again to Oklahoma State until 2002, going 35-0-1 over that span (the Cornhuskers and Cowboys tied 10-10 at Stillwater in 1973).

Missouri

Top notch defensive stands defined the first half of the game as both teams fought to a scoreless draw at the half.  The Tigers managed to finally get a field goal in to open the scoreboard in the third quarter, and the Cornhuskers were unable to answer.  A fourth-quarter touchdown put the game away as Nebraska suffered the season's second loss.  It was Missouri's fifth straight decision in the series as they improved to 23–28–3 and kept the Missouri-Nebraska Bell another year.  The Tigers finished the season ranked number 11 in the AP Poll at 7–2–1, and placed 2nd in the Big 8.

Kansas

Nebraska's early success out of the gate turned into another spiral into oblivion when Kansas brought an efficient and productive offense to town.  The Cornhuskers were unable to answer as the Jawhawks ran out to a two-touchdown lead by the half.  A single touchdown in the second half, followed by a failed two-point conversion, was the only feeble response that Nebraska could muster.  Kansas was still only 18–43–3 in the series, but Nebraska's 3–0 start was now 3–4 and headed the wrong way.

Iowa State

The score was closer than the game seemed to be played, as Nebraska rolled up yards with relative ease.  HB Bill Thornton accumulated more rushing yards than the entire Cyclone team.  Iowa State didn't just give the game away, however, battling the Cornhuskers to a hard-earned 13–13 tie as time was running out.  Finally, with just eight seconds remaining, PK Ron Meade put the ball through the uprights for 3 and a Nebraska win.  The Cornhuskers continued to own the series, 43–11–1.

Colorado

 A cold and wet day with melting snow on the ground saw the #8 Buffaloes out to prove their ranking and avoid the typical Nebraska upset of highly ranked teams.  True to their ranking, Colorado completely stifled every offensive effort attempted by the Cornhuskers. It was only due to the poor on-field conditions that sustained Buffalo drives repeatedly failed to produce points. Though the win was decided by a single touchdown, the visiting team from Boulder completely outplayed Nebraska. Colorado's defense denied the Cornhuskers any first downs or completed passes through the entire game, for only the second time in the history of the program back to 1890. The triumphant Buffaloes took a 10–9–1 series lead. Colorado went on to finish the season ranked #7 by the AP Poll at 9–2 and claiming the Big 8 title before losing 7–25 to the #4 LSU Tigers in the Orange Bowl.

Oklahoma

The final game of the season was a tale of two different games.  The first half was a 14–0 Nebraska domination as the struggling Sooners looked like they would fall to the Cornhuskers for the third straight game in the series.  Oklahoma Head Coach Bud Wilkinson apparently made an effective plea during the halftime break, as the Sooners emerged a changed team for the second half.  All Nebraska offense was stymied from that point on, as Oklahoma tallied 21 straight to come back and salvage their season at 5–5.  The Oklahoma comeback helped them recover the lead in the series at 19–18–3, a lead that they would never relinquish.

After the season
In five seasons as the head coach of the Nebraska football program, Bill Jennings compiled a 15–34–1 record, including an 8–24 record in the conference (4–14 as the Big Seven, 4–10 as the Big 8). After the season, the University of Nebraska replaced Jennings with Bob Devaney, who had been successful at Wyoming, going 35–10–5 in Laramie.  Devaney would go on to a great career as the head coach, as he helped to transform Nebraska from a losing football program into one of the most successful programs in college football history.  The 3–6–1 season of 1961 would also be the last time the Cornhuskers ended the season with a losing record during the 20th century.  Nebraska would not finish below .500 until the 2004 season.

Future professional players
Brown, Robert, 1964 2nd-round pick of the Philadelphia Eagles
Dennis Claridge, 1963 3rd-round pick of the Green Bay Packers
 Bob Jones, 1964 18th-round pick of the Washington Redskins
Monte Kiffin, 1964 15th-round pick of the Minnesota Vikings
Larry Kramer, 1964 15th-round pick of the Baltimore Colts
Bill (Thunder) Thornton, 1963 5th-round pick of the St. Louis Cardinals
Mick Tingelhoff, Minnesota Vikings
 Willie Ross, 1964 9th-round pick of the St. Louis Cardinals

References

Nebraska
Nebraska Cornhuskers football seasons
Nebraska Cornhuskers football